Daniel Sandford is an English TV journalist.

Early life and education
Sandford was born in 1965-66 in Oxford. His family moved to Ethiopia when he was 3 and he received his primary education there at the English School, which had been founded by his grandmother some 20 years earlier. The family returned to the UK after the 1974 Ethiopian revolution and he received his secondary education at Magdalen College School, an independent school for boys in Oxford, and sang as a chorister in the choir of Magdalen College, Oxford. He studied physics and electronics at the University of Southampton, graduating in 1988.

Career
From January 1989 to May 1998, Sandford worked at ITN, where his roles included that of Home Affairs Producer, Africa Producer and General Reporter.

In 1998 he joined the BBC, acting as Home Affairs Producer and Health Correspondent. In 2002 he became Home Affairs Correspondent. He reported on the terrorist attacks in London in July 2005, and the airline "liquid bomb plot" of August 2006. In May 2020 the BBC was obliged to apologise after 'incorrect' and 'disappointing' claims by Sandford live on air that Welsh borders would not be policed when Welsh Health minister Vaughan Gething and Rhun ap Iorwerth, MS for Ynys Môn criticised his remarks over the difference in COVID-19 lockdown rules in England and Wales.

Personal life and family background

He is the grandson of Brigadier Daniel Sandford and the great nephew of Lieutenant Richard Douglas Sandford VC. He is also related to Daniel Fox Sandford (1831–1906), Bishop of Tasmania, Daniel Keyte Sandford (1798–1838), Scottish politician and Greek scholar and Daniel Sandford, (1766–1830), Bishop of Edinburgh.

He is married to Caro Kriel, the former head of international news for Sky News. He has two children.

References

British reporters and correspondents
BBC newsreaders and journalists
English television presenters
Living people
People educated at Magdalen College School, Oxford
Alumni of the University of Southampton
British emigrants to Ethiopia
Year of birth missing (living people)